Minnesota Medical Association (MMA) is a non-profit professional association representing physicians, residents, and medical students. With 10,000 members, the MMA is an advocate on health care issues at the State Capitol and in Washington, D.C. It provides a connection between physicians and lawmakers through a variety of events at the State Capitol and in legislator's home districts.

Publications
The MMA keeps physicians up to date on the events and issues that affect their practice through various publications including:
 Minnesota Medicine is MMA's monthly journal which provides practical information as well as political, economic, and public health articles.
 The Physician Advocate is MMA's monthly news publication within Minnesota Medicine that focuses on events at the Minnesota Legislature and MMA's advocacy on behalf of physicians and their patients.
 MMA News Now is a weekly email newsletter that includes breaking health care news and links to longer articles on the MMA website.
 The Journal-Lancet, formerly known as "Journal of the Minnesota State Medical Association and the Northwestern Lancet"

History
On July 23, 1853, John H. Murphy and 10 young physicians gathered at the new St. Paul courthouse for the first ever medical profession convention. This convention was the formation of the Minnesota Medical Society. The 11 young physicians voted Thomas R. Potts, previously the first Mayor of St. Paul, Minnesota, their president. John Murphy and A.E. Ames were made co-vice presidents. The group adopted a constitution and bylaws. Within this constitution was the article titled "The Objects of the Society". The objects included: the elevation of professional character; the protection of all measures… [designed] to improve health and protect the lives of the community; the advancement of medical knowledge; and the protection of the interests of its members."

1853 – The Minnesota Medical Society is formed.

1869 – The Minnesota Medical Society reorganizes as the Minnesota State Medical Society.

1870 – The medical society adopts an amended constitution and bylaws, which establish a mechanism for examining prospective members for the diploma of membership in the society.

1871 – The Minnesota State Medical Society seeks and obtains passage of a law for the registration of vital statistics.

1872 – The Minnesota State Medical Society initiates legislation that creates a state board of health, only the third in the nation.

1880 – The Minnesota State Medical Society admits three women physicians.

1883 – The Minnesota State Medical Society helps overcome resistance to the new antiseptic surgery or Listerism.

1887 – The Minnesota State Medical Society persuades the Legislature to pass the nation's first state law requiring physicians to be examined by a board of medical examiners in order to practice.

1888 – The Minnesota State Medical Society supports the creation of the University of Minnesota's medical school.

1891 – The first expulsion of a member from the Minnesota State Medical Society is enforced due to advertising that is considered unethical.

1903 – The Minnesota State Medical Society changes its name to the Minnesota Medical Association.

1918 – The MMA launches the journal Minnesota Medicine.

1925 – Malpractice legislation proposed by the MMA becomes law.

1926 – The MMA begins to encourage regular health examinations for patients.

1928 – The MMA works with legislators to pass the Basic Science Bill, which helps set standards for the education and qualifications of practicing health care providers and allows the state to prosecute illegal practitioners and quacks.

1940 – The MMA creates a Committee on Medical Testimony to investigate and study cases referred to it by judges who believe that false medical testimony has been deliberately given.

1947 – The MMA begins a nonprofit prepaid medical service, Minnesota Medical Service Inc.

1975 – The MMA successfully pushes for Minnesota's Clean Indoor Air Act—the first in the nation.

1980 – The MMA launches its physician-owned liability company, the Minnesota Medical Insurance Exchange (however, no longer in partnership) in response to skyrocketing premiums.

1984 – The MMA helps found the anti-tobacco group Minnesota Smoke-Free 2000.

1986 – The MMA successfully advocates for tort reform legislation that addresses frivolous malpractice lawsuits.

1987 – Only 14 percent of drivers wear seatbelts. The MMA successfully pushes for a law requiring seatbelt use.

1989 – The MMA and Utah Medical Association form the Geographic Coalition to raise awareness of geographic disparities in Medicare reimbursement and work for their correction.

1997 – The MMA convinces the Legislature to reduce the MinnesotaCare tax from 2% to 1.5%. The MMA succeeds in eliminating the $400 surcharge on physician medical licenses.

2000 – The MMA successfully advocates for a prompt pay law.

2003 – Gov. Pawlenty proclaims July 23, 2003, the MMA's 150th anniversary, Minnesota Medical Association Day.

2004 - The MMA inaugurates its first Hispanic President and declares obesity a disease.

2005 – The MMA released its health care reform vision, Physicians' Plan for a Health Minnesota

2006 - The MMA brought together influential leaders in health care, business, state government, labor, education, and consumer advocacy to form an independent group, Healthy Minnesota: A Partnership for Reform.

2007 - The MMA achieved its top public health priority with the passage of the Freedom to Breathe Act, which prohibits smoking in restaurants and bars.

2008 - The MMA worked at the Minnesota Legislature to pass health care reform legislation that includes many aspects of the MMA's vision for health care reform.

References

External links
 MMA home page

Healthcare in Minnesota
1853 establishments in Minnesota Territory
Organizations established in 1853
American Medical Association